Leonid Zhdanov (1927–2009) was a Russian dancer and photographer. Younger brother of a dancer Yury Zhdanov.

Biography
Zhdanov was born on June 23, 1927 in Moscow, Russia. He was a pupil of Nikolai Tarasov at the Moscow Ballet School. Like his elder brother Yury he joined the Bolshoi Theatre's ballet company after the graduation. He participated in double roles with such  principal dancers as Galina Ulanova, Raisa Struchkova, Maya Plisetskaya, Alicia Alonso, and many others. Later on, he came back to the Moscow Ballet School as a teacher of male classical dance and pas de deux. He brought up such dancers as Dmitry Gudanov and Andrei Fedotov. One of his last students was Vladislav Lantratov.

He also was a painter and a dance photographer. Inspired by Henri Cartier-Bresson, a French photographer he kept a collection of 400,000 negatives of his ballet photos. Few books on ballet, included an album about art of Maya Plisetskaya and two albums about Moscow Ballet School based on his photographs were published.

He died on May 14, 2009.

References

1927 births
2009 deaths
Russian male ballet dancers
Dancers from Moscow
Bolshoi Ballet principal dancers
Moscow State Academy of Choreography people
Ballet photographers
Soviet photographers
Photographers from Moscow
Ballet masters
20th-century Russian ballet dancers